Lorenzo Carbonell Santacruz (Alicante, 1883—1968) was the mayor of Alicante between 1931 and 1936.

He was a member of the Republican Youth of Alicante and was elected to the Council of Alicante in 1909 under a Republican-Socialist coalition, before founding the Radical Republican Socialist Party (RRSP) in the city.

In the 1931 municipal elections, 81% of the votes in Alicante were for the Republican-Socialist coalition, and he was unanimously elected the mayor of Alicante.

During his term, an ambitious program of urban reform was instigated, for example the urbanisation of a part of the centre of the city that was blocking the urban expansion, creation of new ways of communication, increasing the construction of schools, and a project to urbanise the beach at San Juan, which counted on the support of the  Minister of Public Works, Indalecio Prieto.

1883 births
1968 deaths
People from Alicante
Radical Socialist Republican Party politicians
Politicians from the Valencian Community